Breakwater Island is a small island in the Palmer Archipelago with a line of rocks extending in a southwest arc from it, lying opposite Nipple Peak,  off the east side of Wiencke Island. The descriptive name, suggestive of an artificial breakwater, was given by the Falkland Islands Dependencies Survey in 1944.

See also 
 List of Antarctic and sub-Antarctic islands

References 

Islands of the Palmer Archipelago